A by-election for the constituency of Bradford South in the United Kingdom House of Commons was held on 8 December 1949, caused by the death of the incumbent Labour MP Meredith Titterington on 28 October of that year. The result was a hold for the Labour Party, with their candidate George Craddock winning with a majority of 4,022 and 51.3% of the vote.

This was the final parliamentary by-election to be held during the 1945-1950 Parliament.

Result

References

See also
 Bradford South

Bradford South by-election
Bradford South by-election
Bradford South by-election
South, 1949
Bradford South by-election, 1949